Vriesea pardalina is a plant species in the genus Vriesea. This species is native to Brazil.

References

pardalina
Flora of Brazil